The 2022 Bratislava Open was a professional tennis tournament played on clay courts. It was the 3rd edition of the tournament which was part of the 2022 ATP Challenger Tour. It took place in Bratislava, Slovakia between 6 and 12 June 2022.

Singles main-draw entrants

Seeds

 1 Rankings are as of 23 May 2022.

Other entrants
The following players received wildcards into the singles main draw:
  Miloš Karol
  Lukáš Klein
  Peter Benjamín Privara

The following player received entry into the singles main draw using a protected ranking:
  Attila Balázs

The following player received entry into the singles main draw as an alternate:
  Daniel Dutra da Silva

The following players received entry from the qualifying draw:
  Evgeny Karlovskiy
  Oleksii Krutykh
  Fábián Marozsán
  Alejandro Moro Cañas
  Johan Nikles
  Oleg Prihodko

The following players received entry as lucky losers:
  Filip Jianu
  Louis Wessels

Champions

Singles

 Alexander Shevchenko def.  Riccardo Bonadio 6–3, 7–5.

Doubles

  Sriram Balaji /  Jeevan Nedunchezhiyan def.  Vladyslav Manafov /  Oleg Prihodko 7–6(8–6), 6–4.

References

2022 ATP Challenger Tour
June 2022 sports events in Slovakia
2022 in Slovak sport